Bernhard Altmann (1888–1960) was an Austrian textile manufacturer whose business was Aryanized and whose family's art collection was looted by Nazis because of their Jewish origins. He introduced cashmere wool to North America on a mass scale in 1947.

Early life 
Altmann was the son of Karoline Keile (Tischler) and Karl Chaskel Altmann. His family was Jewish. He entered the textile trade in Vienna in 1915, and in 1919 founded his knitwear manufacturing business. His company grew to employ 1000 people by 1938 before the German Anschluss forced him to flee to London.

Nazi persecution and exile 
When Austria joined Hitler's Third Reich in 1938, Altman's textile plant and properties in Vienna were confiscated (Aryanized) by the Nazis. His brother Fritz Altmann – husband of Jewish refugee Maria Altmann, who made her living in America after the war selling Bernhard's cashmere sweaters – was taken prisoner by the Nazis and Bernhard was forced to sign over the business in return for Fritz's release from Dachau Concentration Camp.

Altmann started a factory in Liverpool in 1938, which he had to abandon in 1939 as a result of The Blitz and the UK Enemy alien Act of 1939, in which all nationals of enemy countries had to withdraw from coastline cities in three days after the declaration of war. After Liverpool he immigrated to the United States, where he started a company in Fall River, Massachusetts. After two years he lost control of his assets. In 1941 Altmann moved to New York City, where he took a job at $50 a week.

Postwar Life in USA 
The cashmere business started in North America in 1947 when Altmann added the cashmere fiber line; he subsequently opened a factory in Texas. By 1951 it was reported that one in every three cashmere sweaters sold in America came from Altmann's Texas mill.

Altmann also produced clothes in Shetland wool, vicuna and a lambswool/fur fibre blend called "Bernamere". A 1960s advertising tagline for the company ran: "The Legend of a Great Knitter."

Nazi-looted art 
Altmann is the brother-in-law of  Maria Altmann whose restitution claim for artworks looted by the Nazis went to the Supreme Court and was the subject of the film Woman in Gold starring Helen Mirren, and the father-in-law of painter and fashion designer Ruth Rogers-Altmann.

Artworks seized from Bernhard Altmann by the Gestapo in 1938, were sold via the Dorotheum auction house and ended up in Österreichische Galerie Belvedere, Vienna. Some artworks, like Klimt's "Portrait of a Lady" were restituted in 2004.

See also 
 Aryanization
 The Holocaust in Austria
 Vugesta
 Maria Altman
 List of claims for restitution for Nazi-looted art

References

Textile industry of the United States
1888 births
1980 deaths
Businesspeople from Vienna
Textile mills in the United States
Jewish emigrants from Austria to the United States after the Anschluss
Nazi-looted art